Air Canada Flight 621 was an Air Canada Douglas DC-8, registered as CF-TIW, that crashed on July 5, 1970, while attempting to land at Toronto Pearson International Airport. It was flying on a Montreal–Toronto–Los Angeles route. It crashed in Toronto Gore Township, now part of Brampton.

All 100 passengers and 9 crew on board were killed, and at the time it was Canada's second-deadliest aviation accident.

Aircraft
The aircraft involved was a Douglas DC-8 60 series, powered by four Pratt & Whitney JT3D engines and delivered new to Air Canada just three months prior to the accident. At the time of the incident the aircraft had accumulated only 453 hours of flight time. The aircraft was registered CF-TIW and was the 526th DC-8 built at the Long Beach assembly plant. The 60 series was a stretched version of the DC-8 that was 36.7 feet longer than the DC-8 series models 10 through 50.

History 

Captain Peter Cameron Hamilton and First Officer Donald Rowland had flown on various flights together before, and had an ongoing discussion on when to arm the ground spoilers. They agreed that they did not like arming the spoilers at the beginning of the final approach, as specified in the checklist, fearing it could lead to an inadvertent spoiler deployment. The captain preferred not arming them at all, but directly deploying them once on the ground, while the co-pilot preferred arming them during the landing flare. Neither procedure was approved, as the spoilers should have been armed in the pre-landing check. The flight engineer, Harry Gordon Hill, correctly called for the spoiler deployment as evidenced in the CVR transcript.

When executed just above the runway, the landing flare procedure arrests the aircraft's descent just prior to touchdown. By raising the aircraft's nose (pitching up), lift momentarily increases, reducing the descent rate, and the main wheels may then gently contact the runway. During the flare, pilots normally retard the throttles to idle to reduce engine thrust. A squat switch within the main landing gear then signals the touchdown and automatically deploys the spoilers, if armed. This destroys any remaining lift and helps the aircraft slow down.

The pilots made an agreement that, when the captain was piloting the aircraft, the first officer would deploy the spoilers on the ground as the captain preferred, and when the first officer was piloting the aircraft, the captain would arm them on the flare as the co-pilot preferred.

In this particular instance, the captain was piloting the landing and said, "All right. Give them to me on the flare. I have given up." This was not the pilots' usual routine. Sixty feet from the runway, the captain began to reduce power in preparation for the flare and said "Okay" to the first officer. The first officer immediately deployed the spoilers on the flare instead of just arming them. The aircraft began to sink heavily and the captain, realizing what had happened, pulled back on the control column and applied full thrust to all four engines. The nose lifted, but the aircraft still continued to sink, hitting the runway with enough force that the number four engine and pylon broke off the wing, and the tail struck the ground. Realizing what he had done, the first officer began apologizing to the captain. Apparently unaware of the severity of the damage inflicted on the aircraft, the crew managed to lift off for a go-around, but the lost fourth engine had torn off a piece of the lower wing plating and the aircraft was now trailing fuel, which ignited. The first officer requested a second landing attempt on the same runway but was told it was closed (because of the debris the DC-8 had already shed) and was directed to another runway.

Two and a half minutes after the initial collision, the outboard section of the right wing above engine number four exploded, causing parts of the wing to break off. Six seconds after this explosion, another explosion occurred in the area of the number three engine, causing the combined pylon and engine to break off and fall to the ground in flames. Six and a half seconds after the second explosion, a third explosion occurred, destroying most of the right wing, out to the wing tip.

Wreckage, body parts, bits of clothing and personal effects were strewn for more than  beyond the impact spot.

The crash occurred in a farm field located near what is now Castlemore Road and McVean Drive in Brampton, Ontario. Memorial and witness accounts at the time reported the crash was in Woodbridge. This was because in 1970, prior to urban sprawl and changes in municipal boundaries, the site was closer to Woodbridge than Brampton.

This was the first Air Canada accident involving fatalities and the first hull loss of a DC-8 series 63. In November 1963, another DC-8 of Trans-Canada Air Lines (the precursor to Air Canada) Flight 831, also bound from Montreal to Toronto, had crashed with a loss of 118 lives.

Investigation 

A board of inquiry was established to investigate the crash. The board published its official report on January 29, 1971, in which the accident was attributed to pilot error. Eight recommendations were provided, including that the activating lever for the spoilers should be designed in such a way that it could not be activated while the DC-8 is in flight, that the manufacturer should reinforce the structural integrity of the DC-8's wings and fuel tank and that Air Canada training and operating manuals should clarify the operating procedures regarding spoiler arming and deployment.

Aftermath 

Recovery and identification of bodies proceeded slowly after the crash because of the need to excavate the crash crater to a significant depth. More than 20 of the passengers were United States citizens, all of them listed as being from Southern California.

On July 30, 1970, 52 victims, 49 of whom were identified, were buried at Mount Pleasant Cemetery, and in May 1971 an obelisk and stone monument were erected (Plot 24-1) at the site, with all 109 victims' names inscribed. In 1979, Air Canada added an additional memorial at the cemetery.

In June 2002, Castlemore resident Paul Cardin, who had been inspired by a November 2001 Toronto Sun article revisiting the Flight 621 crash scene, discovered aircraft wreckage and possible human bone shards at the site. The Peel Regional Police investigated the findings, and it was later determined that the bones were not of recent origin, and had indeed come from the crash. Continuing searches of the crash site by archaeologist Dana Poulton and Friends of Flight 621 (a Brampton-based advocacy group founded by Cardin) produced hundreds of additional human bone fragments.

Memorial garden dedication in 2013 

Since the crash, the surrounding area of the crash site itself has experienced significant residential urbanization. In January 2007, the landowners, in conjunction with the property developers, filed an application to designate a section of the crash site as a cemetery and memorial garden. On July 7, 2013, the memorial was officially opened at the site near Degrey Drive and Decorso Drive in present-day Brampton.

The small memorial park, approximately a third of a hectare in size (~3,000 m2), contains lilacs and 109 markers of polished white granite arranged in a random configuration within a bed of black granite paving stones. A polished black granite plaque listing all the victims' names is mounted on a large pink granite boulder. Diarmuid Horgan, coordinator of the memorial site, said that he hoped the dedication ceremony would help victims' families find closure.

In popular culture 
The events of the crash featured in an episode of the History channel documentary Disasters of the Century, titled "Out of the Blue".

References

Further reading 
 A chance to say goodbye: Memorial site of horrific Air Canada crash prompts reader memories, The Globe and Mail, July 5, 2013. Retrieved from GlobeandMail.com July 7, 2013.

External links 
 
 Cockpit voice recorder transcript
 Official accident report (Internet Archive) - Webcitation archive
 Friends of Flight 621  via the Internet Archive (Archive version)
 
 Location of Flight 621 Memorial Garden

1970 in Canada
Accidents and incidents involving the Douglas DC-8
Air Canada accidents and incidents
Aviation accidents and incidents in 1970
Airliner accidents and incidents caused by pilot error
Airliner accidents and incidents in Canada
History of Brampton
Toronto Pearson International Airport
1970 in Ontario
July 1970 events in Canada
1970 disasters in Canada